William Pierpont Black (born Wilhelm Peter Negrescu;  1877, Bucharest – 29 April 1942, Auckland, New Zealand) was a New Zealand wood carver, journal editor and publisher, journalist. He was born in Bucharest, Romania in circa 1877.

References

1870s births
1942 deaths
New Zealand journalists
New Zealand publishers (people)
Artists from Bucharest
Romanian emigrants to New Zealand
Romanian Jews
New Zealand Jews
Woodcarvers